Enza Barilla (born 10 April 1991) is an Australian football (soccer) player, who last played for Melbourne Victory in the Australian W-League. Barilla also plays for Bundoora United FC, along with fellow Victory players Gülcan Koca and Rachel Alonso.

References

1991 births
Living people
Australian women's soccer players
Melbourne Victory FC (A-League Women) players
A-League Women players
Australian people of Italian descent
Women's association football midfielders
Soccer players from Melbourne